16th Politburo may refer to:
 16th Politburo of the Chinese Communist Party
 Politburo of the 16th Congress of the All-Union Communist Party (Bolsheviks)
 16th Politburo of the Communist Party of Czechoslovakia